Abderrahmane Rahmouni (13 January 1945 – 23 October 2020) was a Tunisian footballer. He joined Club Africain at the age of 18 after being noticed by coach Fabio Roccheggiani. He played for the club from 1964 to 1973, when he joined AS Kasserine as a player-coach.

Awards
Champion of Tunisia (1964, 1967, 1973)
Winner of the Tunisian Cup (1965, 1967, 1968, 1969, 1970, 1972, 1973)
Winner of the Maghreb Cup Winners Cup (1971)
Winner of the Maghreb Champions Cup (1974)

References

Tunisian footballers
Tunisia international footballers
Club Africain players
Tunisian Ligue Professionnelle 1 players
People from Sfax
1945 births
2020 deaths
Association footballers not categorized by position